Kaafiron Ki Namaaz is  a 2016 Hindi language film written and directed by Ram Ramesh Sharma. The film was digitally released on 7 April 2016.

External links

References

2016 films
2010s Hindi-language films
Kashmir conflict in films
Indian direct-to-video films
2016 direct-to-video films